Boyd's Tavern, also known as Boyd Tavern, Exchange Hotel, and Boydton Hotel, is a historic inn and tavern located at Boydton, Mecklenburg County, Virginia. It is a rambling two-story, frame structure built in at least three stages during the 19th century. The earliest section is the central section and it dates to about 1800. The front facade features a full-length two-story porch with sawn-work decoration.

It was listed on the National Register of Historic Places in 1976. It is located in the Boydton Historic District.

References

External links
 The Boyd Tavern - official site

Drinking establishments on the National Register of Historic Places in Virginia
Commercial buildings completed in 1800
Buildings and structures in Mecklenburg County, Virginia
National Register of Historic Places in Mecklenburg County, Virginia
Individually listed contributing properties to historic districts on the National Register in Virginia
Museums in Mecklenburg County, Virginia
Taverns in Virginia